Renzo Pasquale Zeglio Agresta (born 27 June 1985) is a Brazilian fencer. He competed in the individual sabre events at the 2004, 2008 and 2012 Summer Olympics.

He began fencing when he was 12, at the Paulistano club.  As part of his preparation for the 2012 Olympics, he moved to Rome in order to improve his fencing.

References

1985 births
Living people
Brazilian male sabre fencers
Olympic fencers of Brazil
Fencers at the 2004 Summer Olympics
Fencers at the 2008 Summer Olympics
Fencers at the 2012 Summer Olympics
Fencers at the 2016 Summer Olympics
Fencers at the 2015 Pan American Games
Sportspeople from São Paulo
Pan American Games bronze medalists for Brazil
Pan American Games medalists in fencing
South American Games gold medalists for Brazil
South American Games bronze medalists for Brazil
South American Games medalists in fencing
Competitors at the 2010 South American Games
Medalists at the 2015 Pan American Games
21st-century Brazilian people